St. Mark's Church is a parish of the Episcopal Church in the Diocese of Central New York, noted for its historic church at 19 White Street in Clark Mills, Oneida County, New York.

The community had been served by clergy from Westmoreland until villagers, the Clark Company (of the eponymous mills), and clergy raised funds to build the local church in 1863. The cornerstone was laid June 6, 1863 and the parish was legally organized on November 17.

The church is a board-and-batten Gothic Revival style structure. A one-story parish house was added to the south transept in 1895. It was listed on the National Register of Historic Places in 1996.

References

External links
 

Episcopal church buildings in New York (state)
Churches on the National Register of Historic Places in New York (state)
Carpenter Gothic church buildings in New York (state)
Churches completed in 1863
19th-century Episcopal church buildings
Churches in Oneida County, New York
National Register of Historic Places in Oneida County, New York
Religious organizations established in 1863